John F. Kennedy University was a private university based in California with offices in Pleasant Hill, San Jose in California; Natick, Massachusetts; and Willemstad, Curaçao. The university was founded in 1965 to offer degrees and certificates for non-traditional higher education students, taught mostly by adjunct faculty. In April 2009, the university became an affiliate of the National University System initially as an independent university. The institution closed in 2020 with programs transferred to other National University schools.

Academics
The institution was organized as a collegiate university comprising four constituent colleges which conferred undergraduate and graduate degrees in business, psychology, law, and medicine. The university did not own a traditional campus and instead taught either through distance education or blended learning. Physical locations of the university for blended learning programs were typically housed in leased office sites and business parks.

College of Undergraduate Studies
John F. Kennedy University College of Undergraduate Studies was accredited by the WASC Senior College and University Commission (formerly known as the Western Association of Schools and Colleges). The college offered certificate programs, undergraduate degrees, and graduate degrees, including a JD-MBA dual degree and MBA. The college also housed the university's experimental Institute of Entrepreneurial Leadership (IEL) which offered certificate programs and low-cost office spaces. The Sanford Institute of Philanthropy was also housed at the college.

College of Psychology and Holistic Studies
The College of Psychology and Holistic Studies was a graduate institution which offered certificates, master's, and doctoral degrees. The college held experiential learning curriculums through three community-based clinical internship programs. The counseling psychology program housed student-operated art camps which taught self-confidence and self-expression to elementary-aged children. The Family Resiliency Project, also under the counseling psychology program, operated with Californian school districts for family counseling and childhood behavioral therapy. The Solt Evans LEAP Project in the Sports Psychology program provided disadvantaged youth life skills lessons through athletics. The college also operated three University Counseling centers in California which provided affordable, confidential access to mental health services.

College of Law
John F. Kennedy University College of Law offered four-year, part-time program, and three-year programs. The college housed a Housing Advocacy and Legal Clinic offered free legal services to elderly locals at risk of eviction. The college had an enrollment of 160 students at the time of closure.

Although it conferred the Juris Doctor degree, the college was accredited by the Committee of Bar Examiners of the State Bar of California rather than the more professionally recognized American Bar Association. The lack of ABA accreditation limited the ability of graduates to take bar exams and practice as attorneys outside the state of California. The college had a California Bar first-attempt pass rate of 33% in October 2020.

School of Medicine 
The John F. Kennedy University School of Medicine offered a 4-year, offshore Doctor of Medicine degree program which accepted Curaçaoans and international applicants from the US and Canada. The school was approved by the World Federation for Medical Education (WFME), FAIMER, Medical Council of India, and the World Health Organization to hold its third and fourth-year clinical rotations sites outside of Curaçao in the United States, South Africa, and the United Kingdom. As an offshore medical school, the college followed the legal convention at the time in which classes were given outside the US in Willemstad, Curaçao while it kept a legal address in the US in Natick, Massachusetts. Though the college's clinical training was marketed to North American students, the curriculum itself was neither accredited by the Educational Commission for Foreign Medical Graduates nor by the Caribbean Accreditation Authority for Education in Medicine and other Health Professions and graduates did not qualify to practice in the US.

See also

List of memorials to John F. Kennedy
List of medical schools in the Caribbean
List of online colleges in the United States
List of defunct private universities in California

References

External links
 

 
Law schools in California
Private universities and colleges in California
Universities and colleges in Alameda County, California
Universities and colleges in Contra Costa County, California
Universities and colleges in Santa Clara County, California
Universities and colleges in Santa Cruz County, California
University
Pleasant Hill, California
Schools accredited by the Western Association of Schools and Colleges
Educational institutions established in 1964
1964 establishments in California
Defunct law schools